Suna Ellen Kymäläinen (born 15 September 1976) is a Finnish politician currently serving in the Parliament of Finland for the Social Democratic Party of Finland at the South-Eastern Finland constituency.

References

Living people
Members of the Parliament of Finland (2019–23)
Social Democratic Party of Finland politicians
21st-century Finnish politicians
21st-century Finnish women politicians
Women members of the Parliament of Finland
1976 births